Launch America is a public–private partnership between the United States and multiple space companies, closely related to the NASA's Commercial Crew Program. The term "Launch America" was used as early as May 2016. The initiative aims to end the NASA's reliance on the Russian space agency by developing launch systems that can carry crews to space from American soil.

The first space launch under the "Launch America" banner occurred at the Demo-2 mission on 30 May 2020, successfully taking two astronauts to the International Space Station. This marked both the first launch of astronauts by a wholly commercial provider mission in the world, as well as the first crewed space launch by the U.S. in a decade, and the first ever crewed space launch by SpaceX.

Flights

Notes

References

 
Space program of the United States
Public–private partnership projects in the United States